The County of Cilli was a Medieval county in the territory of the present-day Slovenia. It was governed by the Counts of Cilli (also Counts of Celje).

History

Creation 
County of Cilli was created after lords of Saneck inherited lands in Slovenia. They continuously gained land via strategic marriages and their loyalty to their immediate liege, the Habsburgs of Austria. Hermann II, Count of Celje was also father-in-law to the Hungarian king Sigismund who eventually became the Holy Roman Emperor and granted multiple fiefs in Slavonia and Croatia to his father-in-law. After Sigismund, the Luxembourg line went extinct and the Habsburgs succeeded as Emperor, further strengthening the Count of Cilli. The last count, Ulrich II, Count of Celje was assassinated by a faction in Hungary without an heir. His possessions within the Empire were inherited by the Habsburgs of Austria, while his possessions outside of the Empire were inherited by the crown of Hungary, which would also come under Habsburg rule less than a century later under Ferdinand I.

References 

Medieval Slovenia
Counties of the Holy Roman Empire